The Atlantic Terra Cotta Company, established in 1846 as A. Hall and Sons Terra Cotta, was founded in Perth Amboy, New Jersey due to Perth Amboy's rich supplies of clay.  It was one of the first successful terra cotta companies in the United States.  Originally, the company produced porcelain and household wares but transitioned to terra cotta items. The company, always located at 59 Buckingham Avenue, changed its name to the Perth Amboy Terra Cotta Company and then to Atlantic Terra Cotta which, as the preeminent architectural terra cotta producer in the United States, went on to produce in its kilns the terra cotta for such notable buildings as the United States Supreme Court, the Philadelphia Museum of Art, and the Woolworth Building.

See also
 Perth Amboy Terra Cotta Company
 Flatiron Building

References

External links

 Atlantic Terra Cotta Company Records at the University of Texas

Perth Amboy, New Jersey
Companies based in Middlesex County, New Jersey
Companies established in 1846
1846 establishments in New Jersey
American companies disestablished in 1943